The Universal Service Directive or formally Directive 2002/22/EC of the European Parliament and of the Council of 7 March 2002 on universal service and users' rights relating to electronic communications networks and services addresses so called universal service obligations and users' rights related to telecommunications in the European Union. The directive mandates that emergency services be accessible by dialing 112 on phones in EU member states.

See also 
UK enterprise law
 Telecommunications in the European Union
 Universal service
 Broadband universal service

References

External links
Text of the directive in HTML with headers
Legislation summary by the European Union

European Union directives
Telecommunications law
2002 in law
2002 in the European Union